Disaster Response Route (DRR) is a network of pre-identified municipal and provincial roads in the Province of British Columbia, Canada that can best move emergency services and supplies to where they are needed in the event of a major disaster. These roads are part of the Coordinated Regional Emergency Transportation Strategy and are intended for emergency responders when a disaster strikes and are not evacuation routes for the public.

History

DRR came to the Province after witnessing the traffic mayhem after disasters like the 1989 San Francisco and 1994 Los Angeles earthquakes; and the September 11 terrorist attacks. It was decided that BC will require a system to control post-disaster traffic and BC became the first jurisdiction in the world to implement a disaster response road plan in 1995. In the original plan, only Vancouver roads were considered but eventually expanded to marine routes, railways and air transports.

DRR roads are capable of withstanding natural disasters and the roads all link to Abbotsford, more specifically to Abbotsford International Airport. While DRR consists mostly of roads, emergency plans also includes marine routes suitable for quick access for responders.

There were confusion since the launch of the program with the general public - the original sign did not include the third tab (Emergency Vehicles Only During a Disaster) which led many to believe these roads are for evacuation when disaster strikes. Since 2004, the Ministry of Transportation added the third tab and increased public awareness to promote the correct use of these roads during a disaster.

Operation
Roads that are pre-marked as DRR are open to the general public unless a state of emergency was declared by the municipal or provincial government. Once a state of emergency is declared, DRR can be activated and the local police will be responsible for cordoning off the roads. As soon as possible, the public will be allowed back onto the Disaster Response Routes.

DRR is intended for those who have the following function to access the roads within 72 hours of a disaster strikes:
 Transport/diagnose/treat sick & injured
 Transport displaced persons
 Maintain law and order
 Extinguish fires & control hazards
 Control traffic & evacuations
 Search and Rescue
 Protect public health and prevent spread of communicable diseases
 Assess damage
 Restore damaged transportation systems
 Restore communications infrastructure
 Restore water/gas/electricity supplies
 Manage any of the above

Specifically, 'DRR users' are categorized into 3 groups:
 First Responders - designated responders
 British Columbia Ambulance Service
 Fire & Rescue
 Police
 Key management staff
 Critical Service Providers - designated responder for the duration of the emergency
 Provincial Emergency Program volunteers
 Hospital staff
 Traffic controllers
 Public Works personnel
 Public Health officials
 Utility (hydro, electricity, etc.) crews
 Specialist Responders - designated responder only when called upon and only when performing specific recovery-related tasks
 Canadian Forces
 Canadian Coast Guard
 Structural engineer inspectors
 Technicians
 Supply delivery personnel
 Maintenance Crews

Once activated, only those who have been issued with DRR hangers (for automobiles) or DRR decals (on Driver's license, employee ID or government IDs) will be able to access the designated roads.

See also
 Provincial Emergency Program
 Emergency Social Services
 E-Comm

References

External links
 Ministry of Transportation DRR
 DRR Maps
 Disaster Response Routes – DO NOT Use in Case of Emergency
 Drive Smart BC
 Disaster Response Route brochure
  Corporation of Delta DRR
 City of Richmond DRR

Transport in British Columbia
Emergency management in Canada
Transport in Greater Vancouver